Ormyrus nitidulus is a parasitoid species of wasp in the family Ormyridae. It is primarily associated with oak gall wasps. Ormyrus nitidulus is a small metallic wasp approximately 5mm long as an adult.  It has a fairly widespread distribution being found across North Africa, the Middle East, North America and Europe.

Distribution
The Universal Chalcidoidea Database  cites distribution records for Ormyrus nitidulus from: Algeria, Andorra, Austria, Azerbaijan, Belgium, Bosnia Hercegovina, Bulgaria, Caucasus, Croatia, Czech Republic, Czechoslovakia, Denmark, Europe, France, Georgia, Germany, Greece, Hungary, Iran, Italy, Sardinia, Sicily, Jordan, Macedonia, Netherlands, North Africa, Romania, Serbia, Slovakia, Slovenia, Spain, Sweden, Switzerland, Turkey, Ukraine, United Kingdom, United States of America, USSR, Yugoslavia (pre 1991). 

GBIF holds 128 georeferenced records for Ormyrus nitidulus

Biology
Ormyrus nitidulus larvae are idiobiont (prevent further development of the host after initial parasitization) ectoparasitoids (live on the outside of its host) primarily associated with oak gall wasps including multiple species of Andricus and one species of gall midges: Oligotrophus bergenstammi .  .T

Morphology and identification
Ormyrus sp. are generally characterised by bright metallic colours, coarsely crenulated sculpture of the metasoma, well-developed hind coxae, short stigmal veins and two stout and curved metatibial spurs. As of 2016 there are 4 species of Ormyrus recognised in the UK: Ormyrus gratiosus, Ormyrus papaveris, Ormyrus nitidulus and Ormyrus pomaceus. In order to distinguish between Ormyrus species there are a number key resources available including: Oak-galls in Britain by Williams, R and Zerova’s 2006 key to Palaearctic Ormyridae.

NHM data portal 
There are 10 specimens of Ormyrus nitidulus available to view on the NHM Data Portal. This includes 4 specimens from the Antoni Ribes Escolà (1968-2014) Collection.

References

Insects described in 1804
Chalcidoidea